FiftyTwoDegrees is an  high-rise building in Nijmegen, Netherlands.
It is from a special design. Its lower floors are built as an inclined tower, while its upper sections are from conventional design.
FiftyTwoDegrees was completed in 2007.

See also
Mecanoo

External links
 http://skyscraperpage.com/diagrams/?b33936
 https://web.archive.org/web/20071009105433/http://www.fiftytwodegrees.com/ftd/

Buildings and structures in Nijmegen
Towers in Gelderland
Skyscraper office buildings in the Netherlands
Office buildings completed in 2007
2007 establishments in the Netherlands
21st-century architecture in the Netherlands